The inaugural Grand Prix F3000 de Belgique, was the sixth round of the 1985 International Formula 3000. This was held at Circuit de Spa-Francorchamps, on 2 June.

Report

Entry
A total of 18 F3000 cars were entered for the event.

Qualifying
Michel Ferté took pole position for Oreca Motorsport, in their March Engineering-Cosworth 85B, averaging a speed of 131.195 mph.

Race

The race was held over 29 laps of the Circuit de Spa-Francorchamps. Mike Thackwell took the winner spoils for works Ralt team, driving their Ralt-Cosworth RT20. The Kiwi won in a time of 1hr 11:56.51mins., averaging a speed of 104.434 mph. Over 50 seconds adrift, was the second place car of Alain Ferté, driving Corbari Italia's March 85B. The podium was completed by the BS Automotive March of Christian Danner.

Classification

Race Result

 Fastest lap: Mike Thackwell, 2:26.769secs. (106.163 mph)

References

F3000
Belgique
Grand Prix F3000 de Belgique